Frank Lisle (1916–1986) was a British painter and art teacher, who numbered a young David Hockney among his pupils when he was Head of Art at Bradford College of Art.

He was principal of Jacob Kramer College from 1970 to 1977.

Among his portrait sitters were another pupil, Donald Rooum, and Alice Bacon, MP for North-East Leeds.

His work is in collections including those of The Hepworth Wakefield, and Leeds City Council.

References

External links 
 
 Biography

1916 births
1986 deaths
20th-century English painters
English male painters
British art teachers
Artists from Bradford
20th-century English male artists